Menegazzia caviisidia is a rare species of foliose lichen found in Japan. It was formally described as a new species in 2004 by Jarle Bjerke and Peter James. Characteristics of the lichen include its numerous spherical to finger-like (dactyliform) to narrowly obovate, hollow isidia, and small conical perforations in the thallus. It contains thamnolic acid as the major lichen product in the medulla.

See also
List of Menegazzia species

References

caviisidia
Lichen species
Lichens described in 2004
Lichens of Japan
Taxa named by Peter Wilfred James